It Takes a Thief is the debut studio album by American rapper Coolio. It was released on July 19, 1994, on Warner Bros. Records. The album received praise for bringing a humorous and lighthearted perspective to the often violent and profane themes of typical gangsta rap.

"Fantastic Voyage," a hit from the early 1980s, returned to the charts after Coolio released a song of the same name from this album. The song received regular airplay on MTV and became his breakout hit, peaking at No. 3 in the US. Songs "Smokin Stix," "Can-o-Corn," and "Sticky Fingers" first appeared in the film Poetic Justice.

Track listing

Charts

Weekly charts

Year-end charts

References

External links
 

1994 debut albums
Coolio albums
Tommy Boy Records albums
Gangsta rap albums by American artists
G-funk albums